The Spruce Run Earthworks is an archaeological site located in the central part of the U.S. state of Ohio, in Delaware County. It is believed to have been built by the Adena culture.

See also
 Highbanks Metropolitan Park Mounds I and II
 Highbank Park Works

References

External links

Adena culture
Archaeological sites in Ohio
National Register of Historic Places in Delaware County, Ohio
Archaeological sites on the National Register of Historic Places in Ohio
Woodland period